TV Ke Uss Paar is  an Indian sitcom which aired on Zindagi. In UK, the show is aired on &TV.

Plot
TV Ke Uss Paar is a thrilling ride of a mother-son duo - Madhu and Vivek. Vivek works at an MNC while the mother spends her time watching television. His mothers craze for daily soaps leads her into the reel world, and soon, Vivek follows her there, too.

Main Cast
Amita Khopkar as Madhu ji (Maa)
Aakash Ahuja as Vivek (Madhu's Son)
Sheen Dass as Kavya (Vivek's Boss and love interest)
Suman Singh as Shivanjali (Madhu's Daughter)
Sakshi Mehta as Shimar Pyaar Bharadwaj (T.V  Star Heroine) 
Shabaaz Abdullah Badi as Pyaar Bharadwaj (T.V Star Hero)

Recurring Cast
Tisha Kapoor as Jenny
Rupa Sahu as Sudha (Madu's Friend)
Priti Arora as Timmy (Madhu's Friend)
Tasneem Ali as Rosy (Madhu's Friend)
Tasha Kapoor as Kritika
Monika Meena as Boki
Rohit Tailor as vehem(boki's husband)
Surabhi Mallick as Aagya
Nisha Pareek as Santosh Kumari

References

Zee Zindagi original programming
2016 Indian television series debuts
2017 Indian television series endings
Indian television series
Indian television sitcoms